Saheba may refer to:

Amiesh Saheba (born 1959), Indian cricket umpire and former cricketer
Mahesh Saheba (1932–2006), Indian cricketer
Samrat Saheba (born 1981), Indian cricketer
Shishunaala Sharif Saheba, 19th-century poet of North Karnataka, South India
Saheba (film), a 2017 Kannada language film

See also
Thaayi Saheba (Kannada: ತಾಯಿ ಸಾಹೇಬ), a Kannada language film released in 1997 directed by Girish Kasaravalli